Eldar Ragib Ogly Mamedov (born 5 January 1990) is a Russian former professional football player.

Club career
He played one season in the Russian Football National League for FC Irtysh Omsk in 2010.

External links
 
 

1990 births
Sportspeople from Omsk
Living people
Russian footballers
Association football midfielders
FC Irtysh Omsk players
Sumgayit FK players
FC Energiya Volzhsky players
FC Olimpia Volgograd players
Russian expatriate footballers
Expatriate footballers in Azerbaijan
Azerbaijan Premier League players